Akil Municipality (Yucatec Maya: "place of the vines") is one of the 106 municipalities in the Mexican state of Yucatán containing (48.54 km2) of land and is located roughly  southeast of the Capital State.

History
There is no accurate data on when the town was founded, but it was a settlement before the conquest. Yucatán declared its independence from the Spanish Crown in 1821, and in 1825 the area was assigned to the High Sierra partition with headquarters in Tekax Municipality. In 1848, one of the bloodiest battles of the Caste War of Yucatán occurred in Akil between Maya rebels and troops under the command of Colonel José Dolores Cetina.

In 1919, it became its own municipality.

Governance
The municipal president is elected for a three-year term. The town council has seven councilpersons, who serve as Secretary and councilors of public works, public lighting, health, public security, public monuments, and nomenclature.

Communities
The head of the municipality is Akil, Yucatán. The municipality has 9 populated places besides the seat including Plan Chác, el Rancho Kitinché, San Diego and San Martino. The significant populations are shown below:

Local festivals
Every year in the second week of April there is a festival in honor of Santa Inés.

Tourist attractions
 Church of Santa Inés, built during the sixteenth century
 Archaeological site at Akil
 Archaeological site at Sac nicte Akil

References

Municipalities of Yucatán